The province of Vibo Valentia is a province in the Calabria region of southern Italy, set up by a national law of 6 March 1992 which came into effect on 1 January 1996, and formerly part of the Province of Catanzaro. Its capital is the city of Vibo Valentia and its vehicle licence plate code is VV. The province has an area of  (7.6% of the total surface of Calabria), and a total population of 168,894 (ISTAT 2005); the city Vibo Valentia has a population of 35,405. There are 50 comuni (singular: comune) in the province, see list of communes of the Province of Vibo Valentia.

It was first settled by Italic tribe the Sicels and Vibo Valentia was established as a city in the 6th or 7th century, known as Hipponion by the Greeks of Messina and Reggio. Following this, the city was later recolonised by people from town Locri in the region of Calabria. Dionysius I of Syracuse had the city of Hipponion destroyed, and authority of the city subsequently passed to Ancient Carthage, tribe Bruttii, Greek Agathocles of Syracuse, and then the Locrians, before being conquered by Ancient Rome in around 230 BCE. In around 400 CE it was attacked repeatedly before being destroyed by the Muslims. Frederick II, Holy Roman Emperor had the town rebuilt in the 13th century, and in 1284 it passed to the Ruffo family. Ferdinand I of Naples had a fort constructed in Pizzo Calabro in 1486.

In June 2010 a dormant volcano was discovered off the coast of the province on the line of the fault that led to the 1905 Calabria earthquake. It is a mountainous province and is situated on the Tyrrhenian Sea.

Government

References

External links
 Official website 

 
Vibo Valentia